Constantin David (born December 25, 1912, date of death unknown) is a Romanian boxer who competed in the 1936 Summer Olympics. In 1936 he was eliminated in the first round of the lightweight class after losing his fight to Mario Facchin.

References

External links
Constantin David's profile at Boxrec.com

1912 births
Year of death missing
Lightweight boxers
Olympic boxers of Romania
Boxers at the 1936 Summer Olympics
Romanian male boxers